The First Battle of Berezina was a battle fought around the Berezina in the Polish-Soviet war. It ended with a Polish victory and the capture of 1000 Soviet prisoners.

Berezina (1919)
The Soviet Western Army retreated to the Rivers Dvina and Berezina following the successful capture of Wilno, Minsk and Lwow in the Borders region. Pilsudski's Polish Army, consisting of the Northern Group, commanded by General Stanisław Szeptycki, and the Southern Group, commanded by General Władysław Sikorski, were linked by the end of autumn.

See also 
 Battle of the Berezina (1920)

References

1919 in Poland
1919 in Russia
1919 in Belarus
Berezina
Berezina